Consort Qi (1676 – 31 May 1739), of the Han Chinese Li clan, was a consort of the Yongzheng Emperor. She was two years his senior.

Life

Family background
Consort Qi's personal name was not recorded in history.

 Father: Wenbi, served as a prefect

Kangxi era
The future Consort Qi was born in 1676. In 1691 or 1694, Lady Li entered the residence of Prince Yong of the First Rank, Yinzhen, and became his secondary consort. On 15 August 1695, she gave birth to her first child a daughter, Princess Huaike of the Second Rank. On 19 July 1697, she gave birth to her second child, a son, Hongfen, who died prematurely on 30 March 1699. On 19 September 1700, she gave birth to her third child, a son, Hongyun, who died at the age of ten on 10 December 1710. On 18 March 1704, she gave birth to her fourth child, a son, Hongshi.

Yongzheng era
The Kangxi Emperor died, and was succeeded by his son, Yongzheng Emperor on 27 December 1722. On 28 March 1723, she was given the title of "Consort Qi".

Qianlong era
Lady Li died on 31 May 1739. She was interred in the Tai Mausoleum, in the Western Qing tombs.

Titles
 During the reign of the Kangxi Emperor (r. 1661–1722):
 Lady Li (from 1676)
 Secondary consort (from 1691 or 1694)
 During the reign of the Yongzheng Emperor (r. 1722–1735):
 Consort Qi (from 28 March 1723), fourth rank consort

Issue
 As secondary consort:
 Princess Huaike of the Second Rank (15 August 1695 – April/May 1717), the Yongzheng Emperor's second daughter
 Married Xingde (d. 1739) of the Manchu Nara clan in September/October 1712
 Hongfen (19 July 1697 – 30 March 1699), the Yongzheng Emperor's second son
 Hongyun (19 September 1700 – 10 December 1710), the Yongzheng Emperor's third (second) son
 Hongshi (18 March 1704 – 20 September 1727), the Yongzheng Emperor's fourth (third) son

In fiction and popular culture
 Portrayed by Zhang Yameng in Empresses in the Palace (2011)
 Portrayed by Li Man in Palace II (2012)

Notes

References
 

1676 births
1739 deaths
Consorts of the Yongzheng Emperor
18th-century Chinese people
18th-century Chinese women